Kazhakoottam is a major suburb in the capital city of Thiruvananthapuram, Kerala state, India. The largest IT Park of the country in terms of developed area Technopark along with Technocity an upcoming integrated IT township is situated here. Hence it is known as the Information Technology capital of Kerala. It is one of the fastest growing area of the state.

History 

Kazhakuttom was the centre of power for Kazhakuttathu Ugran Pillai who was prominent among the so-called Ettuveetil Pillamar (Pillais from Eight Houses) who rebelled against Travancore King Marthanda Varma in the late 18th century. After defeating Pillai, Varma destroyed his palace and replaced it with a pond. To redeem himself, he built a temple to Krishna nearby. Both the pond and the temple survive.

The Kazhakuttom Mahadeva Temple is believed to be 1000 years old.

Administration

Kazhakootam is the 1st ward in Thiruvananthapuram Corporation which is administered by the Mayor.
Kazhakoottam assembly constituency is one of the 140 assemblies of the Kerala Legislative Assembly.  It is represented by Kadakampally Surendran from CPI(M) 2016 onwards. The Kazhakootam constituency also belongs to the greater Thiruvananthapuram Lok Sabha Constituency which is represented by Dr. Shashi Tharoor MP (Indian National Congress) from 2009 onwards in the Indian Parliament. 
Kazhakuttam ward councillor V.K. Prashanth from CPI(M) was elected as the Mayor of Trivandrum in November 2015.

Transportation

Kazhakoottam is a major junction where 
the National Highway 66 (India)  Trivandrum Bypass and the main road towards the city are joined. It is well connected to all major destinations in the city by bus services from Kazhakoottam.
The nearest airport is Trivandrum International Airport which is at a distance of 14 km.
The nearest railway station is Kazhakuttam railway station.

 
NH 66 Trivandrum

Institutions 
 Technopark
 KINFRA Apparel Park, Menamkulam
 KINFRA Film and Video Park, Chanthavila
 Rajiv Gandhi Institute of Biotechnology
 Regional Women's Training Institute

Major attractions
 Vikram Sarabhai Space centre Space Museum - 5km
 Thumba Beach - 4km
 Greenfield International Stadium - 2km
 Lulu Mall - 7km
 Mall of Travancore - 14 km
 Akkulam Tourist Village - 8km
 Mudavoorpara Rock Cut Temple - 8km
 Magic Planet - 3km

Government offices 
 Pothencode Block Panchayat Office (Erstwhile Kazhakkottam Block Panchayat)
 Kazhakkottam Village Office
 Kerala State Electricity Board Kazhakkoottam
 Kazhakkoottam Sub Registrar Office
 Kazhakkoottam RTO Office

Academic institutions 
 Sainik School Kazhakkoottam
 Government HS, Kazhakkoottam
 Jyothis Central School, Kazhakkoottam
 Al Uthuman English Medium School

Notable people

Premkumar - Actor
Kadakampally Surendran
Adv VK Prasanth

See also

Ulloor 
Technopark, Trivandrum
Thiruvananthapuram Central railway station

References

Suburbs of Thiruvananthapuram